A by-election was held for the New South Wales Legislative Assembly electorate of Glebe on 22 May 1883 because Sir George Allen resigned to go on an extended trip to England.

Dates

Result

George Allen resigned to go on an extended trip to England.

See also
Electoral results for the district of Glebe
List of New South Wales state by-elections

References

1883 elections in Australia
New South Wales state by-elections
1880s in New South Wales